Lenkiewicz is a surname. Notable people with the surname include:

Gabriel Lenkiewicz (1722–1798), Polish-Lithuanian Jesuit
Rebecca Lenkiewicz (born 1968), English playwright
Robert Lenkiewicz (1941–2002), English painter

See also
Wolfe von Lenkiewicz (born 1966), English artist